Johannes Hüppi (born 1965) is a Swiss painter.

The son of Alfonso Hüppi, Johannes Hüppi studied fine arts at the Kunstakademie Düsseldorf from 1984 to 1990, where he was a student of Fritz Schwegler and Dieter Krieg. From  1997 to 2000 he ran a studio in New York City and in 2000/2001 in Miami, Florida. Since 2004 he lives and works in Basel.

From 2004 to 2007 Hüppi was Professor of Painting at the Hochschule für Bildende Künste Braunschweig.

References

This article was initially translated from the German Wikipedia.

20th-century Swiss painters
Swiss male painters
21st-century Swiss painters
21st-century Swiss male artists
1965 births
Living people
Kunstakademie Düsseldorf alumni
Swiss contemporary artists
20th-century Swiss male artists